Rodney Kendrick (born April 30, 1960) is an American jazz pianist, composer, and record producer. He has been described as a "hard swinging player and composer with a delightful Monkish wit and drive".

Career
At twenty-one, Kendrick began a primary focus on jazz, moving to New York City in 1981.  He played keyboards for artists such as Freddie Hubbard, Terence Blanchard, Stanley Turrentine, Clark Terry, J. J. Johnson, and others. He studied with pianist Barry Harris, who remained his teacher and mentor for over 20 years. Kendrick cites Randy Weston and Sun Ra as influences.

Personal life
Kendrick has been married to Rhonda Ross Kendrick since September 13, 1996.  On August 7, 2009, their son, Raif-Henok Emmanuel Kendrick was born.

Discography

References

External links
Jazz Duo-Piano Series with Randy Weston and Rodney Kendrick
Miami New Times: James L. "Jimmy Kay" Kendrick (Published: July 12, 2007)

1960 births
Living people
American jazz pianists
American male pianists
American bandleaders
American jazz composers
Musicians from Philadelphia
Musicians from Miami
20th-century American pianists
Place of birth missing (living people)
Jazz musicians from Pennsylvania
21st-century American pianists
American male jazz composers
20th-century American male musicians
21st-century American male musicians